Shaikh Farid Bukhari (died 1616), also known by the title Murtaza Khan, was a leading Mughal noble during the reign of the Mughal emperors Akbar and Jahangir. He served as governor of Gujarat and later of Punjab. He was also well known as an architectural patron in Mughal India, and founded the city of Faridabad in modern-day Haryana, India.

Background
Shaikh Farid Murtaza Khan was an Indian Muslim. His ancestors were likely learned men who had been given rent-free lands for their subsistence. One of them, Sayyid Abdul Ghaffar of Dehli, enjoined his descendants to adopt military profession instead of living on charity. Sheikh Farid's family had a long history of imperial service, such as his uncle Sheikh Muhammad Bukhari, who was one of Akbar's trusted men, and his brother Jafar Khan, who died fighting in Gujarat in 1573.

Career 

Shaikh Farid was promoted to the command of 1500 horses by Akbar, for his achievements fighting against Afghans in Orissa. Akbar also bestowed upon him the title sahib-us-saif-w-al-qalam ('master of the sword and the pen'). In 1600, he rose to the post of mir bakhshi under Akbar.

In the Mughal court there was a movement of Naqshbandis who had been trying to garner power in the hopes of supplanting the religiously erratic Akbar with a more stable and orthodoxly Muslim emperor. Du Jarric among the Jesuits at court described that Shaykh Farid had been sent as a representative of the orthodox faction to promise support of Prince Salim (future Mughal Emperor Jahangir), "provided that he would swear to defend the law of Mahomet". Shaykh Farid had been receiving letters from Shaykh Ahmad Sirhindi, and was his devoted disciple.

After Jahangir's coronation, prince Khusrau rebelled in 1606 and fled Agra, where he had been confined, towards the Punjab. Shaikh Farid pursued and defeated him at a battle near Bharowal. After Khusrau was later captured, Jahangir awarded Shaikh Farid the title 'Murtaza Khan' for his actions, and his rank was increased to 6000 horses. Jahangir also awarded him the site of the battle, Bharowal, as a land grant.

From 1606 to 1609, Shaikh Farid served as the governor of Gujarat under Jahangir. He later became the governor of Punjab. During this time, Jahangir gave him the infamous order of executing Sikh leader Guru Arjan.

Architecture 
Shaikh Farid was noted for his building activities in Mughal texts. A major undertaking was the establishment of Faridabad in 1607, to which he provided a caravanserai and mosque. As governor of Gujarat, he constructed extensively in the city of Ahmedabad; however none of these structures remain, with the exception of Wajihuddin's Tomb, the dargah of Sufi saint Wajihuddin Alvi. He also contributed several religious structures to the city of Bihar Sharif, and made additions to the Nizamuddin Dargah in Delhi.

Tomb 
Shaikh Farid's tomb is located in Malviya Nagar, Delhi, near a caravanserai constructed by him named Serai Shahji.

References 

Mughal nobility
Subahdars of Gujarat
1616 deaths
16th-century Indian Muslims
16th-century Indian politicians
17th-century Indian politicians
Mughal Subahdars
Faridabad
Faridabad district